Diego Cortes Asencio (July 15, 1931 – October 6, 2020) was an American diplomat who served as United States Ambassador to Colombia (1977–1980) and United States Ambassador to Brazil (1983–86). He was a member of the American Academy of Diplomacy and Council on Foreign Relations.

In 1980 Asencio was – along with a dozen other diplomats – held hostage for 61 days when members of the guerrilla group 19th of April Movement (M-19), led by Rosemberg Pabón, seized the Dominican Republic's embassy in Bogotá.

Books
 Diego Asencio (1983), Our Man Is Inside, Little Brown,

References

Article, Washington Post, Dateline Bogota, Colombia, February 28, 1980, by Charles A Krause, "Envoy Takes Charge" U.S. Ambassador Wins Respect From All With Candor, Wit and Confident Manner

External links

1931 births
2020 deaths
Ambassadors of the United States to Brazil
Ambassadors of the United States to Colombia
Walsh School of Foreign Service alumni
Hispanic and Latino American diplomats